The Lincoln family is an American family of English origins. It includes the fourth United States Attorney General, Levi Lincoln Sr., governors Levi Lincoln Jr. (of Massachusetts) and Enoch Lincoln (of Maine), and Abraham Lincoln, the sixteenth President of the United States.
There were ten known descendants of Abraham Lincoln. The president's branch of the family is believed to have been extinct since its last undisputed descendant, Robert Todd Lincoln Beckwith, died on December 24, 1985, without any acknowledged children.

Actor George Clooney is a distant cousin of Lincoln.

Roots in England
Samuel Lincoln's father Edward Lincoln was born about 1575 and remained in Hingham, Norfolk, England.  He died on February 11, 1640, and was buried in the graveyard of St Andrew's Church. Edward was the only son of Richard Lincoln (buried 1620) and Elizabeth Remching. After the death of his wife, Richard married three more times. There is some debate and at the time, some contesting discussions relating to the contents of Richard's will. Richard was left an inheritance from his father who in turn had it left from his father before him. By convention, his son Edward would inherit the lands and holdings in Hingham, Norfolk, but Richard's 4th wife had instead convinced him to leave the entire proceeds of the will to her and his three youngest children. With no reason to stay, Edward's children, including Thomas 'the weaver' Lincoln and Samuel Lincoln of Hingham, Norfolk, England, made the perilous journey to the New World.

History

First generation

The Lincoln family arrived in Massachusetts Bay Colony in 1637, when Samuel Lincoln (1622–1690), the son of Edward Lincoln, sailed on the ship John & Dorothy from Great Yarmouth. He is considered as the patriarch of the Lincoln family in the United States.

Seventh generation

Abraham Lincoln (1809–1865) was a lawyer, politician and the 16th president of the United States from 1861 to 1865. He was born in a one-room log cabin on Sinking Spring Farm near Hodgenville, Kentucky, to Thomas Lincoln and Nancy Hanks. He married Mary Ann Todd and had four children: Robert, Edward, Willie, and Tad.

Eighth generation
Of Lincoln's four sons, only Robert Todd survived past the age of 18. He married Mary Eunice Harlan (1846–1937), daughter of Senator James Harlan and Ann Eliza Peck of Mount Pleasant, Iowa. They had three children, two daughters and one son:
{| 
|
 Mary "Mamie" Lincoln (1869–1938)
 Abraham Lincoln II (nicknamed "Jack"; 1873–1890)
 Jessie Harlan Lincoln (1875–1948)

Ninth generation
Mary "Mamie" Lincoln married Charles Bradford Isham and had one son, Lincoln Isham (1892–1971).

Jessie Harlan Lincoln married three times. She had a daughter and a son, both with her first husband, Warren Wallace Beckwith:

 Mary Lincoln Beckwith (1898–1975)
 Robert Todd Lincoln Beckwith (1904–1985)

Tenth generation
Lincoln Isham married Leahalma Correa. They did not have any children.

Robert Todd Lincoln Beckwith (1904–1985) was a gentleman farmer and great-grandson of Abraham Lincoln. He became the last undisputed descendant of Abraham Lincoln when his sister, Mary, died in 1975, having no children.

Family tree and lineage
This table sets out the ancestors and descendants of President Abraham Lincoln for ten generations.

See also
Nancy Hanks Lincoln heritage – Abraham Lincoln's mother's family heritage

Notes

References

External links
 Lincoln children

 
American families of English ancestry